Francisco Salazar (born 4 August 1992) is a Chilean handball player for Octavio Pilotes Posada and the Chile national team.

References

1992 births
Living people
Chilean male handball players
20th-century Chilean people
21st-century Chilean people